Bernard Ferdinand Popp (December 6, 1917 – June 27, 2014) was an American bishop of the Roman Catholic Church.

Popp was born in Nada, Texas in 1917. He was ordained a priest on February 24, 1943, in San Antonio, Texas. Popp was appointed Auxiliary bishop of the Archdiocese of San Antonio Texas along with Titular Bishop of Capsus on June 3, 1983, and consecrated July 25, 1983. Popp retired as Auxiliary bishop of San Antonio March 23, 1993. He died on June 27, 2014, aged 96.

References

External links
Profile, catholic-hierarchy.org; accessed June 27, 2014. 
San Antonio Diocese website; accessed June 27, 2014.

20th-century American Roman Catholic titular bishops
People from Colorado County, Texas
1917 births
2014 deaths
Catholics from Texas
Roman Catholic Archdiocese of San Antonio